Tyler Randell may refer to:
 Tyler Randell (rugby league)
 Tyler Randell (ice hockey)